Borislava Kireva (Bulgarian: Борислава Кирева) (born 7 January 1989) is a Bulgarian football midfielder currently playing for FC NSA Sofia.

Honours 
NSA Sofia
Winner
 Bulgarian women's football championship: 2013–14

External links 
 

1989 births
Living people
Bulgarian women's footballers
Bulgaria women's international footballers
Women's association football defenders
FC NSA Sofia players
21st-century Bulgarian women